The Men’s individual competition of the 2023 Winter World University Games was held on 14 January 2023, at the Lake Placid Olympic Sports Complex Cross Country Biathlon Center.

Results
The race was started at 12:20.

References

Men's individual